José Augusto Costa Sénica Torres  (8 September 1938 – 3 September 2010), nicknamed "O Bom Gigante" ("The Kind Giant"), was a Portuguese football centre forward and coach. Most of his 21-year senior career was spent at Benfica, with great individual and team success (13 major titles). With the Portugal national team, he participated in two World Cups separated by 20 years, one as player and the other as manager.

Club career

Born in Torres Novas, Santarém District, Torres signed with Benfica in 1959, from local Clube Desportivo de Torres Novas. Even though he featured rarely in his first three seasons combined, he managed to score six Primeira Liga goals in as many games, paving the way for a bright future.

In the 1962–63 season, in only 21 appearances, Torres was crowned the competition's top scorer after netting 26 goals, whilst also helping the league champions to the Taça de Portugal final. It was also during this decade that he would be an instrumental figure as they reached three European Cup finals, alongside attacking partners José Augusto, Mário Coluna, Eusébio and António Simões.

Torres left Benfica in 1971 at nearly 33 years of age, being involved in a deal that sent him and two teammates to Vitória de Setúbal and promising Vítor Baptista in the opposite direction. He scored an average of 13 goals per season for his next club, always in the top division – he also briefly acted as the team's player-coach in 1975 – then ended his career three months before his 42nd birthday after four years at another side in Lisbon, G.D. Estoril Praia, again at that level, suffering relegation in his last year; in 21 seasons in the competition he amassed totals of 374 games and 217 goals, surpassing the 200 mark for Benfica alone.

Torres worked as a manager in the following years, without much success. His biggest achievement was help modest Varzim S.C. to two consecutive finishes outside the relegation zone in the top tier (1982–84).

International career
Torres earned 33 caps for Portugal, scoring 14 goals. His debut came on 23 January 1963 in a 0–1 loss against Bulgaria for the 1964 European Nations' Cup qualification, a third-game replay. He was selected for the 1966 FIFA World Cup in England – as Augusto, Coluna, Eusébio and Simões – where he played all the matches and scored three goals, including the 2–1 winner over the Soviet Union in the third-place playoff, through his main asset, a header.

Torres' last game was a 2–2 draw, again against Bulgaria for the 1974 World Cup qualifiers, on 13 October 1973 (at the age of 35). It would also be longtime club and national teammates Eusébio and Simões' last international appearance.

After leaving Varzim, aged 46, Torres was named national team manager. In the last match of the 1986 World Cup qualifiers in West Germany, Portugal needed a win to qualify. Prior to the game in Stuttgart he uttered "Please allow me to dream", and his side eventually won it 1–0 thanks to a Carlos Manuel goal; the finals in Mexico, however, would be marred by the Saltillo Affair, with Portugal being eliminated after the first round.

Later years and death
Torres settled in Lisbon with his wife after his retirement from the football world, with pigeon racing as his main hobby. On 3 September 2010, just five days short of his 72nd birthday and after a long battle with Alzheimer's disease, he died from heart failure.

Career statistics

International

|}

Honours

Club
Benfica
Primeira Liga: 1959–60, 1960–61, 1962–63, 1963–64, 1964–65, 1966–67, 1967–68, 1968–69, 1970–71
Taça de Portugal: 1961–62, 1963–64, 1968–69, 1969–70
Taça de Honra (3)
European Cup runner-up: 1962–63, 1964–65, 1967–68

International
Portugal
FIFA World Cup third place: 1966

Individual
Primeira Liga Top scorer: 1962–63
European Cup Top scorer: 1964–65

Orders
  Officer of the Order of Merit

See also 
 List of men's footballers with 500 or more goals

References

External links

1938 births
2010 deaths
People from Torres Novas
Portuguese footballers
Association football forwards
Primeira Liga players
S.L. Benfica footballers
Vitória F.C. players
G.D. Estoril Praia players
Portugal international footballers
1966 FIFA World Cup players
Portuguese football managers
Primeira Liga managers
Liga Portugal 2 managers
Vitória F.C. managers
G.D. Estoril Praia managers
C.F. Estrela da Amadora managers
Varzim S.C. managers
Boavista F.C. managers
Portimonense S.C. managers
C.D. Beja managers
Portugal national football team managers
1986 FIFA World Cup managers
Deaths from dementia in Portugal
Deaths from Alzheimer's disease
Sportspeople from Santarém District
UEFA Champions League top scorers